Priscilla Papers is an academic journal published by the Christians for Biblical Equality, covering "evangelical scholarship on issues of equality." The editor-in-chief is Jeffrey D. Miller.

It was established in 1987, shortly before CBE was formed.

References

External links 

Publications established in 1987
Quarterly journals
Academic journals published by learned and professional societies
Christianity studies journals
English-language journals